Dhanish Karthik (born 24 July 1985) is an Indian actor. He made his debut as Sanjeev Menon in the Malayalam film Ivide (2015) directed by Shyamaprasad. His family is based in Manjeri, Kerala, India.

Work

References

External links

Dhanish Karthik's Official Facebook Page

Living people
Indian male film actors
Stony Brook University alumni
Male actors from New York City
Manjeri
People from Malappuram district
1989 births